Robin McLaurin Williams (July 21, 1951August 11, 2014) was an American actor and comedian. Known for his improvisational skills and the wide variety of characters he created on the spur of the moment and portrayed on film, in dramas and comedies alike, he is regarded as one of the greatest comedians of all time. He received numerous accolades including an Academy Award, two Primetime Emmy Awards, six Golden Globe Awards, two Screen Actors Guild Awards, and five Grammy Awards.

Williams began performing stand-up comedy in San Francisco and Los Angeles during the mid-1970s, and released several comedy albums including Reality ... What a Concept in 1980. He rose to fame playing the alien Mork in the ABC sitcom Mork & Mindy (1978–1982). He made his first leading film role in Popeye (1980). Williams went on to win the Academy Award for Best Supporting Actor for Good Will Hunting (1997). His other Oscar-nominated roles were for Good Morning, Vietnam (1987), Dead Poets Society (1989), and The Fisher King (1991). 

Williams also starred in the critically acclaimed dramas The World According to Garp (1982), Moscow on the Hudson (1984), Awakenings (1990), Patch Adams (1998), One Hour Photo (2002), and World's Greatest Dad (2009). He also starred in box office family films such as Hook (1991), Mrs. Doubtfire (1993), Jumanji (1995), Jack (1996), Flubber (1997), RV (2006), and the Night at the Museum trilogy (2006–2014). He lent his voice to the animated films Aladdin (1992), Robots (2005), Happy Feet (2006), and its 2011 sequel. 

After suffering for many years from depression, paranoia, memory loss and insomnia, Williams died by suicide at his home in Paradise Cay, California on August 11, 2014. He was 63 years old. His autopsy revealed that undiagnosed and severe Lewy body disease had spread widely in his brain. His illness and death sparked debate over the conflation of psychology with neurology.

Early life

Robin McLaurin Williams was born at St. Luke's Hospital in Chicago, Illinois, on July 21, 1951. His father, Robert Fitzgerald Williams, was a senior executive in Ford's Lincoln-Mercury Division. His mother, Laurie McLaurin, was a former model from Jackson, Mississippi, whose great-grandfather was Mississippi senator and governor Anselm J. McLaurin. Williams had two older half-brothers: a paternal half-brother, Robert (also known as Todd), and a maternal half-brother, McLaurin. While his mother was a practitioner of Christian Science, Williams was raised in his father's Episcopal faith. During a television interview on Inside the Actors Studio in 2001, Williams credited his mother as an important early influence on his humor, and he tried to make her laugh to gain attention.

Williams attended public elementary school in Lake Forest at Gorton Elementary School and middle school at Deer Path Junior High School. He described himself as a quiet child who did not overcome his shyness until he became involved with his high school drama department. His friends recall him as very funny. In late 1963, when Williams was 12, his father was transferred to Detroit. He excelled in school, where he was on the school's wrestling team and was elected class president.

As both his parents worked, Williams was partially raised by the family's maid, who was his main companion. When he was 16, his father took early retirement and the family moved to Tiburon, California. Following their move, Williams attended Redwood High School in nearby Larkspur. At the time of his graduation in 1969, he was voted "Most Likely Not to Succeed" and "Funniest" by his classmates. After high school graduation, Williams enrolled at Claremont Men's College in Claremont, California, to study political science; he dropped out to pursue acting. Williams studied theatre for three years at the College of Marin, a community college in Kentfield, California. According to the College of Marin's drama professor, James Dunn, the depth of the young actor's talent became evident when he was cast in the musical Oliver! as Fagin. Williams often improvised during his time in the drama program, leaving cast members in hysterics. Dunn called his wife after one late rehearsal to tell her Williams "was going to be something special".

In 1973, Williams attained a full scholarship to the Juilliard School (Group 6, 1973–1976) in New York City. He was one of 20 students accepted into the freshman class, and he and Christopher Reeve were the only two accepted by John Houseman into the Advanced Program at the school that year. William Hurt and Mandy Patinkin were also classmates. According to biographer Jean Dorsinville, Franklyn Seales and Williams were roommates at Juilliard. Reeve remembered his first impression of Williams when they were new students at Juilliard: "He wore tie-dyed shirts with tracksuit bottoms and talked a mile a minute. I'd never seen so much energy contained in one person. He was like an untied balloon that had been inflated and immediately released. I watched in awe as he virtually caromed off the walls of the classrooms and hallways. To say that he was 'on' would be a major understatement."

Williams and Reeve had a class in dialects taught by Edith Skinner, who Reeve said was one of the world's leading voice and speech teachers; according to Reeve, Skinner was bewildered by Williams and his ability to instantly perform in many different accents. Their primary acting teacher was Michael Kahn, who was "equally baffled by this human dynamo". Williams already had a reputation for being funny, but Kahn criticized his antics as simple stand-up comedy. In a later production, Williams silenced his critics with his well-received performance as an old man in Tennessee Williams's Night of the Iguana. Reeve wrote, "He simply was the old man. I was astonished by his work and very grateful that fate had thrown us together." The two remained close friends until Reeve's death in 2004. Their friendship was like "brothers from another mother", according to Williams's son Zak.

During the summers of 1974, 1975, and 1976, Williams worked as a busboy at The Trident in Sausalito, California. He left Juilliard during his junior year in 1976 at the suggestion of Houseman, who said there was nothing more Juilliard could teach him. Gerald Freedman, another of his teachers at Juilliard, said Williams was a "genius" and that the school's conservative and classical style of training did not suit him; no one was surprised that he left.

Career

Stand-up comedy

Williams began performing stand-up comedy in the San Francisco Bay Area in 1976. He gave his first performance at the Holy City Zoo, a comedy club in San Francisco, where he worked his way up from tending bar. In the 1960s, San Francisco was a center for a rock music renaissance, hippies, drugs, and a sexual revolution, and in the late 1970s, Williams helped lead its "comedy renaissance", writes critic Gerald Nachman. Williams says he found out about "drugs and happiness" during that period, adding that he saw "the best brains of my time turned to mud".

Williams moved to Los Angeles and continued performing stand-up at clubs, including The Comedy Store. There, in 1977, he was seen by TV producer George Schlatter, who asked him to appear on a revival of his show Laugh-In. The show aired in late 1977 and was his debut TV appearance. That year, Williams also performed a show at the L.A. Improv for Home Box Office. While the Laugh-In revival failed, it led Williams into his television career; he continued performing stand-up at comedy clubs such as the Roxy to help keep his improvisational skills sharp. In England, Williams performed at The Fighting Cocks.

With his success on Mork & Mindy, Williams began to reach a wider audience with his stand-up comedy, starting in the late 1970s and throughout the 1980s, including three HBO comedy specials: Off The Wall (1978), An Evening with Robin Williams (1983), and A Night at the Met (1986). Williams won a Grammy Award for Best Comedy Album for the recording of his 1979 live show at the Copacabana in New York City, Reality... What a Concept.

David Letterman, who knew Williams for nearly 40 years, recalls seeing him first perform as a new comedian at The Comedy Store in Hollywood, where Letterman and other comedians had already been doing stand-up. "He came in like a hurricane", said Letterman, who said he then thought to himself, "Holy crap, there goes my chance in show business."

Williams said that, partly due to the stress of performing stand-up, he started using drugs and alcohol early in his career. He further said that he neither drank nor took drugs while on stage, but occasionally performed when hung over from the previous day. During the period he was using cocaine, he said it made him paranoid when performing on stage.

Williams once described the life of stand-up comedians as follows:

Some, such as the critic Vincent Canby, were concerned that his monologues were so intense that it seemed as though at any minute his "creative process could reverse into a complete meltdown". His biographer, Emily Herbert, described his "intense, utterly manic style of stand-up [which sometimes] defies analysis... [going] beyond energetic, beyond frenetic... [and sometimes] dangerous... because of what it said about the creator's own mental state".

Williams felt secure that he would not run out of ideas, as the constant change in world events would keep him supplied. He also explained that he often used free association of ideas while improvising in order to keep the audience interested. The competitive nature of the show made things difficult. For example, some comedians said that Williams had stolen their jokes, which Williams strongly denied. David Brenner claims that he confronted Williams's agent and threatened bodily harm if he heard Williams utter another one of his jokes. Whoopi Goldberg defended him, asserting that it is difficult for comedians not to reuse another comedian's material, and that it is done "all the time". He later avoided going to performances of other comedians to deter similar accusations.

During a Playboy interview in 1992, Williams was asked whether he ever feared losing his balance between his work and his life. He replied, "There's that fear—if I felt like I was becoming not just dull but a rock, that I still couldn't speak, fire off or talk about things, if I'd start to worry or got too afraid to say something.... If I stop trying, I get afraid." While he attributed the recent suicide of novelist Jerzy Kosiński to his fear of losing his creativity and sharpness, Williams felt he could overcome those risks. For that, he credited his father for strengthening his self-confidence, telling him to never be afraid of talking about subjects which were important to him.

Williams's stand-up work was a consistent thread throughout his career, as seen by the success of his one-man show (and subsequent DVD) Robin Williams: Live on Broadway (2002). In 2004, he was voted 13th on Comedy Central's list of "100 Greatest Stand-ups of All Time". After a six-year hiatus, in August 2008, Williams announced a new 26-city tour, Weapons of Self-Destruction. The tour began at the end of September 2009 and concluded in New York on December 3, and was the subject of an HBO Special on December 8, 2009.

Television

Mork & Mindy

After the Laugh-In revival and appearing in the cast of The Richard Pryor Show on NBC, Williams was cast by Garry Marshall as the alien Mork in a 1978 episode of the TV series Happy Days, "My Favorite Orkan". Sought after as a last-minute cast replacement for a departing actor, Williams impressed the producer with his quirky sense of humor when he sat on his head when asked to take a seat for the audition. As Mork, Williams improvised much of his dialogue and physical comedy, speaking in a high, nasal voice, and he made the most of the script. The cast and crew, as well as TV network executives, were deeply impressed with his performance. As such, the executives moved quickly to get the performer on contract just four days later before competitors could make their own offers.

Mork's appearance proved so popular with viewers that it led to the spin-off television sitcom Mork & Mindy, which co-starred Pam Dawber, and ran from 1978 to 1982; the show was written to accommodate his extreme improvisations in dialogue and behavior. Although he portrayed the same character as in Happy Days, the series was set in the present in Boulder, Colorado, instead of the late 1950s in Milwaukee. Mork & Mindy at its peak had a weekly audience of sixty million and was credited with turning Williams into a "superstar". Among young people, the show was very popular because Williams became "a man and a child, buoyant, rubber-faced, an endless gusher of ideas," according to critic James Poniewozik.

Mork became popular, featured on posters, coloring books, lunch-boxes, and other merchandise. Mork & Mindy was such a success in its first season that Williams appeared on the March 12, 1979, cover of Time magazine. The cover photo, taken by Michael Dressler in 1979, is said to have "[captured] his different sides: the funnyman mugging for the camera, and a sweet, more thoughtful pose that appears on a small TV he holds in his hands" according to Mary Forgione of the Los Angeles Times. This photo was installed in the National Portrait Gallery in the Smithsonian Institution shortly after his death to allow visitors to pay their respects. Williams also appeared on the cover of the August 23, 1979, issue of Rolling Stone, photographed by Richard Avedon.

Later appearances

Starting in the late 1970s and throughout the 1980s, Williams began to reach a wider audience with his stand-up comedy, including three HBO comedy specials, Off the Wall (1978), An Evening with Robin Williams (1983), and A Night at the Met (1986). In 1986, Williams co-hosted the 58th Academy Awards. Williams was also a regular guest on various talk shows, including The Tonight Show Starring Johnny Carson and Late Night with David Letterman, on which he appeared 50 times.

Williams appeared with fellow comedian Billy Crystal in an unscripted cameo at the beginning of an episode of the third season of Friends. His many television appearances included an episode of Whose Line Is It Anyway?, and he starred in an episode of Law & Order: Special Victims Unit. In 2006, Williams was the Surprise Guest at the Nickelodeon Kids' Choice Awards, and appeared on an episode of Extreme Makeover: Home Edition that aired on January 30. In 2010, he appeared in a sketch with Robert De Niro on Saturday Night Live, and in 2012, he guest-starred as himself in two FX series, Louie and Wilfred. In May 2013, CBS started a new series, The Crazy Ones, starring Williams, but the show was canceled after one season.

Film

The first film role credited to Robin Williams is a small part in the 1977 low-budget comedy Can I Do It... 'Til I Need Glasses?. His first starring performance, however, is as the title character in Popeye (1980), in which Williams showcased the acting skills previously demonstrated in his television work; accordingly, the film's commercial disappointment was not blamed on his performance. He went on to star as the leading character in The World According to Garp (1982), which Williams considered "may have lacked a certain madness onscreen, but it had a great core". He continued with other smaller roles in less successful films, such as The Survivors (1983) and Club Paradise (1986), though he said these roles did not help advance his film career.

His first major break came from his starring role in director Barry Levinson's Good Morning, Vietnam (1987), which earned Williams a nomination for the Academy Award for Best Actor. The film is set in 1965 during the Vietnam War, with Williams playing the role of Adrian Cronauer, a radio shock jock who keeps the troops entertained with comedy and sarcasm. Williams was allowed to play the role without a script, improvising most of his lines. Over the microphone, he created voice impressions of people, including Walter Cronkite, Gomer Pyle, Elvis Presley, Mr. Ed, and Richard Nixon. "We just let the cameras roll", said producer Mark Johnson, and Williams "managed to create something new for every single take".

Dramatic roles

Many of his subsequent roles were in comedies tinged with pathos, such as Mrs. Doubtfire and Patch Adams. Looking over most of his filmography, one writer was "struck by the breadth" and radical diversity of most of the roles Williams portrayed. In 1989, Williams played a private-school English teacher in Dead Poets Society, which included a final, emotional scene that some critics said "inspired a generation" and became a part of pop culture. Similarly, his performance as a therapist in Good Will Hunting (1997) deeply affected even some real therapists. In Awakenings (1990), Williams plays a doctor modeled after Oliver Sacks, who wrote the book on which the film is based. Sacks later said the way the actor's mind worked was a "form of genius". In 1991, he played an adult Peter Pan in the film Hook, although he had said he would have to lose 25 pounds for the role. Terry Gilliam, who directed Williams in two of his films, The Fisher King (1991) and The Adventures of Baron Munchausen (1988), said in 1992 that Williams had the ability to "go from manic to mad to tender and vulnerable... [Williams had] the most unique mind on the planet. There's nobody like him out there."

Other dramatic performances by Williams include Moscow on the Hudson (1984), What Dreams May Come (1998), and Bicentennial Man (1999).  During the early 2000s, Williams demonstrated a new rank of his versatility by playing darker roles than he had in the previous decades. In Insomnia (2002), Williams portrayed a murderer on the run from a sleep-deprived Los Angeles police detective (played by Al Pacino) in rural Alaska. Also in 2002, in the psychological thriller One Hour Photo, Williams portrayed an emotionally disturbed photo development technician who becomes obsessed with a family for whom he has developed pictures for a long time. In the 2004 science fiction psychological thriller The Final Cut, Williams played a professional who specializes in editing the memories of unsavory people into uncritical memorials that are played at funerals. The Angriest Man in Brooklyn was Williams' last movie to be released while he was alive. In the movie, Williams played Henry Altmann, an angry, bitter man who tries to change his life after being told he has a terminal illness.

Williams' performances garnered him various accolades, including an Academy Award for Best Supporting Actor for his role in Good Will Hunting; as well as two previous Academy Award nominations, for Dead Poets Society, and as a troubled homeless man in The Fisher King, respectively. Among the actors who helped him during his acting career, he credited Robert De Niro, from whom he learned the power of silence and economy of dialogue when acting. From Dustin Hoffman, with whom he co-starred in Hook, he learned to take on totally different character types, and to transform his characters by extreme preparation. Mike Medavoy, producer of Hook, told its director, Steven Spielberg, that he intentionally teamed up Hoffman and Williams for the film because he knew they wanted to work together, and that Williams welcomed the opportunity of working with Spielberg. Having Woody Allen, who directed him and Billy Crystal in Deconstructing Harry (1997), helped Williams. Allen knew that Crystal and Williams had often worked together on stage.

Voice roles

While Williams voiced characters in several animated films, his voice role as the Genie in the animated musical Aladdin (1992) was written for him. The film's directors said they had taken a risk by writing the role. At first, Williams refused the role since it was a Disney movie, and he did not want the studio profiting by selling merchandise based on the movie. He accepted the role with certain conditions: "I'm doing it basically because I want to be part of this animation tradition. I want something for my children. One deal is, I just don't want to sell anything—as in Burger King, as in toys, as in stuff." Williams improvised much of his dialogue, recording approximately 30 hours of tape, and impersonated dozens of celebrities, including Ed Sullivan, Jack Nicholson, Robert De Niro, Groucho Marx, Rodney Dangerfield, William F. Buckley Jr., Peter Lorre, Arnold Schwarzenegger, and Arsenio Hall. His role in Aladdin became one of his most recognized and best-loved, and the film was the highest-grossing of 1992; it won numerous awards, including a Special Golden Globe Award for Vocal Work in a Motion Picture for Williams. His performance paved the way for other animated films to incorporate actors with more star power. He was named a Disney Legend in 2009.

Due to Disney breaking an agreement with Williams regarding the use of the Genie in the advertising for Aladdin, Williams refused to sign on for the direct-to-video sequel The Return of Jafar (1994), where the Genie was instead voiced by Dan Castellaneta. When Jeffrey Katzenberg was replaced by Joe Roth as Walt Disney Studios chairman, Roth organized a public apology to Williams. Williams would, in turn, reprise the role in the second sequel, Aladdin and the King of Thieves (1996).

Williams continued to provide voices in other animated films, including FernGully: The Last Rainforest (1992), Robots (2005), the Happy Feet film franchise (2006-2011), and an uncredited vocal performance in Everyone's Hero (2006). He also voiced the holographic character Dr. Know in the live-action film A.I. Artificial Intelligence (2001). He was the voice of The Timekeeper, a former attraction at the Walt Disney World Resort about a time-traveling robot who encounters Jules Verne and brings him to the future.

Later films

Years after the films, Janet Hirshenson revealed in an interview that Williams had expressed interest in portraying Rubeus Hagrid in the Harry Potter film series, but was rejected by director Chris Columbus due to the "British-only edict". In 2006, he starred in five movies, including Man of the Year, a political satire, and The Night Listener, a thriller about a radio show host who realizes that a child with whom he has developed a friendship may not exist. Four films starring Williams were released after his death in 2014: Night at the Museum: Secret of the Tomb, A Merry Friggin' Christmas, Boulevard, and Absolutely Anything.

Stage work

Williams appeared opposite Steve Martin at Lincoln Center in an off-Broadway production of Waiting for Godot in 1988. He headlined his own one-man show, Robin Williams: Live on Broadway, which played at the Broadway theatre in July 2002. He made his Broadway acting debut in Rajiv Joseph's Bengal Tiger at the Baghdad Zoo, which opened at the Richard Rodgers Theatre on March 31, 2011.

Internet

Williams was the host of a talk show for Audible that aired in April 2000 and was only available on Audible's website.

Additional works

Theatre

Discography

 Reality ... What a Concept (Casablanca, 1979)
 Throbbing Python of Love (Casablanca, 1983)
 A Night at the Met (Columbia, 1986)
 Live 2002 (Columbia, 2002)
 Weapons of Self Destruction (Sony Music, 2009)

Personal life

Marriages and children

Williams married his first wife, Valerie Velardi, in June 1978, following a live-in relationship with comedian Elayne Boosler. Velardi and Williams met in 1976 while he was working as a bartender at a tavern in San Francisco. Their son, Zachary Pym "Zak" Williams, was born in 1983. Velardi and Williams were divorced in 1988.

While it was reported that Williams began an affair with Zachary's nanny, Marsha Garces in 1986, Velardi stated in the 2018 documentary Robin Williams: Come Inside My Mind that the relationship with Garces began after the two had separated. On April 30, 1989, Williams married Garces, who was six months pregnant with their child. They had two children, Zelda Rae Williams (born 1989) and Cody Alan Williams (born 1991). In March 2008, Garces filed for divorce from Williams, citing irreconcilable differences. Their divorce was finalized in 2010.

Williams married his third wife, graphic designer Susan Schneider, on October 22, 2011, in St. Helena, California. The two lived at their house in Sea Cliff, San Francisco, California.

Williams said, "My children give me a great sense of wonder. Just to see them develop into these extraordinary human beings."

Other interests

In New York City, Williams was part of the West Side YMCA runners' running team and showed promising results with 34:21 minutes at a 10K run in Central Park in 1975.

His favorite books were the Foundation trilogy by Isaac Asimov, and his favorite book as a child was The Lion, the Witch and the Wardrobe, which he later shared with his children.

Williams was an enthusiast of both pen-and-paper role-playing games and video games. His daughter Zelda was named after the title character from The Legend of Zelda, a family favorite video game series, and he sometimes performed at consumer entertainment trade shows.

Williams was a big fan of anime and collecting figures. His daughter described him as a "figurine hoarder"; one of his figures was the character Deunan Knute from the anime film Appleseed, which he was a fan of. He also liked the film Innocence Ghost in the Shell, and received a DVD copy of Paranoia Agent signed by its director, Satoshi Kon.

He also became a devoted cycling enthusiast, having taken up the sport partly as a substitute for drugs. Eventually, he accumulated a large bicycle collection and became a fan of professional road cycling, often traveling to racing events such as the Tour de France. In 2016, his children donated 87 of his bicycles in support of the Challenged Athletes Foundation and Christopher & Dana Reeve Foundation.

Religion

Williams was raised and sometimes identified himself as an Episcopalian. In a comedy routine, he described his denomination as "I have that idea of Chicago Protestant, Episcopal—Catholic light: half the religion, half the guilt." He also described himself as an "honorary Jew", and on Israel's 60th Independence Day in 2008, he appeared in Times Square, along with several other celebrities, to wish Israel a happy birthday.

Philanthropy
In 1986, Williams teamed up with Whoopi Goldberg and Billy Crystal to found Comic Relief USA.  This annual HBO television benefit devoted to the homeless raised $80million . Bob Zmuda, creator of Comic Relief, explains that Williams felt blessed because he came from a wealthy home, but wanted to do something to help those less fortunate. Williams made benefit appearances to support literacy and women's rights, along with appearing at benefits for veterans. He was a regular on the USO circuit, where he traveled to 13 countries and performed to approximately 90,000 troops. After his death, the USO thanked him "for all he did for the men and women of our armed forces".

Williams and his second wife, Marsha, founded a philanthropic organization called the Windfall Foundation to raise money for many charities. In December 1999, he sang in French on the BBC-inspired music video of international celebrities doing a cover of The Rolling Stones single "It's Only Rock 'n Roll (But I Like It)" for the charity Children's Promise.

In response to the 2010 Canterbury earthquake, he donated all proceeds of his Weapons of Self Destruction Christchurch performance to help rebuild the New Zealand city. Half the proceeds were donated to the Red Cross and half to the mayoral building fund. Williams performed with the USO for U.S. troops stationed in Iraq and Afghanistan.

For several years, Williams supported St. Jude Children's Research Hospital.

Health

Addiction

During the late 1970s and early 1980s, Williams had an addiction to cocaine. He was a casual friend of John Belushi, and the Saturday Night Live comic's death in 1982 from a drug overdose, which happened the morning after the two had partied together, along with the birth of his own son Zak, prompted him to quit drugs and alcohol: "Was it a wake-up call? Oh yeah, on a huge level. The grand jury helped, too." Williams later said of Belushi's death, "It sobered the shit out of me." Williams turned to exercise and cycling to help alleviate his depression shortly after Belushi's death; according to bicycle shop owner Tony Tom, Williams said, "cycling saved my life."

In 2003, Williams started drinking again while working on the film The Big White (2005) in Alaska. In 2006, he checked himself in to a substance-abuse rehabilitation center in Newberg, Oregon, saying he was an alcoholic. Years afterward, Williams acknowledged his failure to maintain sobriety, but said he never returned to using cocaine, declaring in a 2010 interview:

In mid-2014, Williams admitted himself into the Hazelden Foundation Addiction Treatment Center in Center City, Minnesota, for treatment for alcoholism.

Later health problems

In March 2009, he was hospitalized due to heart problems. He postponed his one-man tour for surgery to replace his aortic valve, repair his mitral valve, and correct his irregular heartbeat. The surgery was completed on March 13, 2009, at the Cleveland Clinic.

His publicist, Mara Buxbaum, commented that he had severe depression before his death. His wife, Susan Schneider, said that in the period before his death, Williams had been sober, but was diagnosed with early-stage Parkinson's disease, which was information he was "not yet ready to share publicly". An autopsy revealed that Williams had diffuse Lewy bodies (which had been misdiagnosed as Parkinson's) and this may have contributed to his depression.

In an essay published in the journal Neurology two years after his death, Schneider revealed that the pathology of Lewy body disease in Williams was described by several doctors as among the worst pathologies they had seen. She described the early symptoms of his disease as beginning in October 2013. Williams's initial condition included a sudden and prolonged spike in fear and anxiety, stress and insomnia, which worsened in severity to include memory loss, paranoia, and delusions. According to Schneider, "Robin was losing his mind and he was aware of it... He kept saying, 'I just want to reboot my brain.

Death
Williams was found dead in his home in Paradise Cay, California, on August 11, 2014. The final autopsy report, released in November 2014, concluded that Williams' death was a suicide resulting from "asphyxia due to hanging". Neither alcohol nor illegal drugs were involved, and prescription drugs present in his body were at therapeutic levels. The report also noted that Williams had depression and anxiety. An examination of his brain tissue suggested Williams had "diffuse Lewy body dementia". Describing the disease as "the terrorist inside my husband's brain", his widow Susan Schneider Williams said that "however you look at it—the presence of Lewy bodies took his life", referring to his previous diagnosis of Parkinson's. She also revealed that in the year before his death, Williams had experienced a sudden and prolonged spike in fear and anxiety, depression, and insomnia, which worsened in severity to include memory loss, paranoia, and delusions. She noted "how we as a culture don't have the vocabulary to discuss brain disease in the way we do about depression. Depression is a symptom of LBD and it's not about psychology – it's rooted in neurology. His brain was falling apart." Medical experts struggled to determine a cause, and eventually diagnosed him with Parkinson's disease.

The Lewy Body Dementia Association (LBDA) clarified the distinction between the term used in the autopsy report, "diffuse Lewy body dementia"—which is more commonly called "diffuse Lewy body disease" and refers to the underlying disease process—and the umbrella term "Lewy body dementia"—which encompasses both Parkinson's disease dementia (PD) and dementia with Lewy bodies (DLB). According to LBDA spokesperson Dennis Dickson, "The report confirms he experienced depression, anxiety, and paranoia, which may occur in either Parkinson's disease or dementia with Lewy bodies.... In early PD, Lewy bodies are generally limited in distribution, but in DLB, the Lewy bodies are spread widely throughout the brain, as was the case with Robin Williams." Ian G. McKeith, professor and researcher of Lewy body dementias, commented that Williams's symptoms and autopsy findings were explained by DLB.

Williams' body was cremated at Monte's Chapel of the Hills in San Anselmo, and his ashes were scattered over San Francisco Bay on August 21, 2014.

Aftermath and tributes

Williams' death instantly became global news. The entertainment world, friends, and fans responded to his death through social and other media outlets. Schneider said: "I lost my husband and my best friend, while the world lost one of its most beloved artists and beautiful human beings. I am utterly heartbroken." His daughter Zelda Williams responded to his death by saying the "world is forever a little darker, less colorful and less full of laughter in his absence".

President Barack Obama released a statement upon Williams's death:

Williams was scheduled to be the "Blackmail" special guest for the final night of Monty Python's ten-date stage shows in London one month before his death—with one of his friends, Monty Python's Eric Idle—but cancelled, stating he was "suffering from severe depression" at the time. When the show was released on video, it was dedicated to Williams.

At the United Nations headquarters on August 12, 2014, Robin Williams was celebrated during the opening of the International Youth Day. In the presence of U.N. Secretary General Ban Ki Moon, Assistant Secretary General Thomas Gass paid tribute to Williams by standing on the pulpit of the ECOSOC Chamber and quoting Keating's lines from the 1989 film Dead Poets Society: "Dare to look at things in a different way!" Several fans similarly paid tribute to Williams on social media with photo and video reenactments of Dead Poets Societys "O Captain! My Captain!" scene.

Shortly after his death, Disney Channel, Disney XD, and Disney Junior all aired the original Aladdin commercial-free over the course of a week, with a dedicated drawing of the genie at the end of each airing before the credits. In honor of his theater work, the lights of Broadway were darkened for the evening of August 14, 2014. That night, the cast of the Aladdin musical honored Williams by having the audience join them in a sing-along of "Friend Like Me", an Oscar-nominated song originally sung by Williams in the 1992 film Aladdin.

Fans of Williams created makeshift memorials at his star on the Hollywood Walk of Fame and at locations from his television and film career, such as the bench in Boston's Public Garden featured in Good Will Hunting; the Pacific Heights, San Francisco home used in Mrs. Doubtfire; the sign for Parrish Shoes in Keene, New Hampshire, where parts of Jumanji were filmed; and the Boulder, Colorado home used for Mork & Mindy.

During the 66th Primetime Emmy Awards on August 25, 2014, close friend and fellow comedian Billy Crystal presented a tribute to Williams, referring to him as "the brightest star in our comedy galaxy". Afterwards, some of Williams's best comedy moments were shown, including his first ever The Tonight Show appearance, indicating his great life in making people laugh. Talk show hosts including David Letterman, Conan O'Brien, Seth Meyers, Jimmy Kimmel, and Jimmy Fallon paid tribute to Williams on their respective shows.

On September 9, 2014, PBS aired a one-hour special devoted to his career, and on September 27, 2014, dozens of leading stars and celebrities held a tribute in San Francisco to celebrate his life and career.

British heavy metal band Iron Maiden dedicated a song to Williams, titled "Tears of a Clown", on their 2015 album The Book of Souls. The song looks into his depression and suicide and how he attempted to hide his condition from the public.

A tunnel, painted with a rainbow, on Highway 101 north of the Golden Gate Bridge was officially named the "Robin Williams Tunnel" on February 29, 2016.

In 2017, Sharon Meadow in San Francisco's Golden Gate Park, the home of the annual Comedy Day, was renamed Robin Williams Meadow.

In 2018, HBO produced a documentary about his life and career. Directed by Marina Zenovich, the film, Robin Williams: Come Inside My Mind, was also screened at the Sundance Film Festival. That same year, a mural of Robin Williams was created on Market Street in San Francisco. Work on a book biography was begun by New York Times writer David Itzkoff in 2014, and was published in 2018, entitled simply Robin.

In August 2020, Vertical Entertainment released a trailer for a new documentary, Robin's Wish, exploring Williams's battle with Lewy body dementia. The film, directed by Tylor Norwood, was digitally released on September 1, 2020.

In a Netflix special released in May 2022, The Hall: Honoring the Greats of Stand-Up inducted Williams into the National Comedy Center in Jamestown, New York.

Influences

Williams credited comedians including Jonathan Winters, Peter Sellers, Nichols and May, and Lenny Bruce as influences, admiring their ability to attract a more intellectual audience with a higher level of wit. He also liked Jay Leno for his quickness in ad-libbing comedy routines, and Sid Caesar, whose acts he felt were "precious".

Jonathan Winters was his "idol" early in life; Williams, aged eight, first saw him on television and paid him homage in interviews throughout his career. Williams was inspired by Winters' ingenuity, realizing, he said, "that anything is possible, that anything is funny... He gave me the idea that it can be free-form, that you can go in and out of things pretty easily."

During an interview in London in 2002, Williams told Michael Parkinson that Peter Sellers was an important influence, especially his multi-character roles in Dr. Strangelove, stating, "It doesn't get better than that." British comedy actors Dudley Moore and Peter Cook were also among his influences, he told Parkinson.

Williams was also influenced by Richard Pryor's fearless ability to talk about his personal life on stage, with subjects including his use of drugs and alcohol, and Williams added those kinds of topics during his own performances. By bringing up such personal matters as a form of comedy, he told Parkinson, it was "cheaper than therapy" and gave him a way to release his pent-up energy and emotions.

Legacy

Although Williams was first recognized as a stand-up comedian and television star, he later became known for acting in film roles of substance and serious drama. He was considered a "national treasure" by many in the entertainment industry and by the public.

His on-stage energy and improvisational skill became a model for a new generation of stand-up comedians. Many comedians valued the way he worked highly personal issues into his comedy routines, especially his honesty about drug and alcohol addiction, along with depression. According to media scholar Derek A. Burrill, because of the openness with which Williams spoke about his own life, "probably the most important contribution he made to pop culture, across so many different media, was as Robin Williams the person."

Williams created a signature free-form comedy persona so widely and uniquely identified that new comedians like Jim Carrey impersonated him, paving the way for the growing comedy scene which developed in San Francisco. Young comedians felt more liberated on stage by seeing his spontaneously diverse range: "one moment acting as a bright, mischievous child, then as a wise philosopher or alien from outer space". According to Judd Apatow, the eclectic performer's rapid-fire improvisational style was an inspiration as well as an influence for other comedians, but his talent was so extremely unusual no one else could possibly attempt to copy it.

His film performances often influenced other actors, both in and out of the film industry. Director Chris Columbus, who directed Williams in Mrs. Doubtfire, says watching him work "was a magical and special privilege. His performances were unlike anything any of us had ever seen, they came from some spiritual and otherworldly place." Looking over most of his filmography, Alyssa Rosenberg at The Washington Post was "struck by the breadth" and radical diversity of most of his roles, writing that "Williams helped us grow up."

Awards

Throughout the course of his career Williams won numerous awards, including an Academy Award for Best Supporting Actor for his role in Good Will Hunting (1997). He also won six Golden Globe Awards, including Best Actor—Motion Picture Musical or Comedy for his roles in Good Morning, Vietnam (1987), The Fisher King (1991) and Mrs. Doubtfire (1993), along with the Special Golden Globe Award for Vocal Work in a Motion Picture for his role Genie in Aladdin (1992), and the Cecil B. DeMille award in 2005. He also received two Primetime Emmy Awards, two Screen Actors Guild Awards, and five Grammy Awards.

References

Footnotes

Sources

Further reading

External links

 
 
 
 

 
1951 births
2014 deaths
2014 suicides
20th-century American comedians
20th-century American male actors
21st-century American comedians
21st-century American male actors
American Episcopalians
American impressionists (entertainers)
American male comedians
American male comedy actors
American male film actors
American male television actors
American male voice actors
American mimes
American philanthropists
American sketch comedians
American stand-up comedians
Audiobook narrators
Best Musical or Comedy Actor Golden Globe (film) winners
Best Musical or Comedy Actor Golden Globe (television) winners
Best Supporting Actor Academy Award winners
Cecil B. DeMille Award Golden Globe winners
Claremont McKenna College alumni
College of Marin alumni
Comedians from Illinois
Columbia Records artists
Detroit Country Day School alumni
Golden Globe Award-winning producers
Grammy Award winners
Juilliard School alumni
Male actors from California
Male actors from Chicago
Male actors from Detroit
Male actors from the San Francisco Bay Area
Outstanding Performance by a Cast in a Motion Picture Screen Actors Guild Award winners
Outstanding Performance by a Male Actor in a Supporting Role Screen Actors Guild Award winners
People from Bloomfield Hills, Michigan
People from Claremont, California
People from Tiburon, California
People with Lewy body dementia
People with mood disorders
Primetime Emmy Award winners
Prop comics
Suicides by asphyxiation
Suicides by hanging in California
United Service Organizations entertainers
Actors with dyslexia
Redwood High School (Larkspur, California) alumni
Disney Legends
Disney people